Cafferkey is a surname. Notable people with the surname include:

Ger Cafferkey (born 1987), Irish Gaelic footballer 
Pauline Cafferkey, British nurse and aid worker

Anglicised Irish-language surnames
Surnames of Irish origin